Antoine Sanfuentes is the Vice President and Managing Editor for CNN's Washington Bureau, where he oversees coverage of the White House and Capitol Hill.

Career

NBC 
Sanfuentes began his career at NBC News in 1990 as an intern in the DC bureau, moving on to become a desk assistant, a production assistant, field producer, futures editor, and a desk editor in quick succession.

In 1995, Tim Russert named Sanfuentes Senior White House Producer, where he led domestic and worldwide coverage for the White House Unit.

Sanfuentes served as the overall producer for live war-time coverage of President George W. Bush’s "Mission Accomplished speech" aboard the USS Lincoln. In 2007, Sanfuentes was responsible for the live news production from a war zone of President Bush’s remarks during his secret visit to the Anbar Province in Iraq.

In February 2007, he led overall coverage for Vice President Dick Cheney's trip to Kabul, Afghanistan where President Karzai was sworn in.

In 2008, Sanfuentes led coverage of then-Senator Barack Obama’s trip to Baghdad, including on-site reporting from Camp Victory and key interviews notably with General David Petraeus.

Sanfuentes has produced countless live Oval Office presidential addresses, as well as presidential speeches both in the US and abroad.

In 2007, Sanfuentes helped land and produced Ann Curry’s exclusive interview with Sudanese then-President Omar al-Bashir in Khartoum.

In 2009, Sanfuentes was promoted to Deputy Bureau Chief in D.C., followed by a promotion to Vice President and Bureau Chief of the NBC News DC bureau in 2011. In 2012, Sanfuentes was promoted again, becoming SVP and Managing Editor of NBC News.

CNN 
In 2014, his former colleague and current CNN president Jeff Zucker hired Sanfuentes over to CNN as a Senior Supervising Producer in DC, overseeing Capitol Hill and White House reporting and coverage worldwide.

In 2017, Sanfuentes was promoted to his current position of VP and Managing Editor of WH and Capitol Hill.

Photography 
In 2009, Sanfuentes had his photos taken in while in Darfur and Chad with Ann Curry featured in an exhibit at the Washington School of Photography in Bethesda, Maryland.

In January 2010, the Honfleur Gallery in Washington, D.C. featured an exhibit of photographic stories created by three artists, including Sanfuentes’ 2008 visit to East Goma with Ann Curry, to help raise awareness and funds for relief efforts in African nations. The stories covered topics including children soldiers of Africa, education and rape.

In 2013, Sanfuentes’ work was featured at The Gallery at Vivid Solutions in Washington, D.C. The exhibit, Unsung Jazz, brought together his ongoing project of documenting the local jazz performers who have had a substantial impact on jazz in Washington, DC but are relatively unknown outside the area.

Awards 
Sanfuentes has earned various awards for his news coverage including:
1999 – Murrow Award
2005 – News and Documentary Emmy Award for Outstanding Live Coverage of a Breaking News Story – Long Form: NBC News – “The Death and Funeral of Ronald Wilson Regan”.
2007 – Gracie Allen Award: Outstanding Podcast – “Crisis in Darfur – A Conversation with Ann Curry".
2007 – News and Documentary Emmy Award for Best Story in a Regularly Scheduled Newscast: NBC Nightly News with Brian Williams – “Crisis in Darfur”; also produced Ann Curry's Emmy award winning reporting in Darfur.
2009 – News and Documentary Emmy Award for Outstanding Live Coverage of a Breaking News Story – Long Form: NBC News – “Decision 2008”.
2009 – Headliner Award: "Dateline NBC – Out of Africa”.

Personal life 
Sanfuentes has recorded as a session drummer in studios musicians such as Danny Gatton and Billy Hancock. He has also recorded several albums with Cathy Ponton King.

References 

Year of birth missing (living people)
Living people